Washington Federal, Inc. is a bank based in Seattle, Washington, in the United States. It is the primary subsidiary of Washington Federal, Inc., a bank holding company. It operates 235 branches in eight western states. WaFd Bank is one of the largest banking institutions in the United States

History
The bank was founded on April 24, 1917, as Ballard Savings and Loan.

In 1958, it merged with and took the name of Washington Federal Savings and Loan.

The bank demutualized in 1982.

The present holding company structure was adopted in 1995.

In 2019, the bank was rebranded as WaFd Bank.

Mergers and acquisitions
 Seattle Federal Savings and Loan, 1971
 First Federal Savings and Loan Association, Mount Vernon, Washington, 1978
 United First Federal, Boise, Idaho, 1987
 Provident Federal Savings and Loan, Boise, 1987
 Northwest Federal Savings and Loan, Boise, 1988
 Freedom Federal Savings and Loan, Corvallis, Oregon, 1988
 Family Federal Savings and Loan Association, Dallas, Oregon, 1990
 First Federal Savings and Loan Association, Idaho Falls, Idaho, 1991
 Metropolitan Savings Association, Portland and Eugene, Oregon, 1991
 First Federal Savings Bank, Salt Lake City, 1993
 West Coast Mutual Savings Bank, Centralia, Washington, 1996
 Metropolitan Bancorp, Seattle, November 29, 1996
 United Savings and Loan Bank (4 branches, based in Seattle) for $65 million in 2003. Founded on July 6, 1960, it was the first savings and loan owned by Asian Americans.
 First Mutual Bank, Bellevue, Washington, 2008
 Horizon Bank (18 branches), seized by the Federal Deposit Insurance Corporation after bank failure, Bellingham, Washington, 2010
 Charter Bank, 6 branches, Albuquerque, New Mexico, 2011 
 South Valley Bancorp Inc., Klamath Falls, Oregon, 2012
 51 branches from Bank of America in Washington, Oregon, Idaho, and New Mexico, 2013
 23 branches from Bank of America in Arizona and Nevada, 2014

References

External links

Companies based in Seattle
Banks based in Washington (state)
Economy of the Western United States
American companies established in 1917
Banks established in 1917
Companies listed on the Nasdaq